Antonio Meneses Saillant, (born Alfonso Antonio Meneses; August 17, 1975) is an American actor, director, screenwriter, producer and green activist. An alumnus of the New York Institute of Technology, where he earned a degree in Aerospace and Mechanical Engineering, and then served as a top Management Executive for over 15 years in the energy field, managing over $1 billion in both the private and public sector. His specialties included energy conservation, energy supply management, energy infrastructure where he evaluated and implemented in many companies and projects.

Born and raised in New York City. Saillant became both an energy engineer and a skilled actor. As an actor, Saillant landed a supporting role as the Italian Henchman in the 2006 film entitled, Killa Season (film) directed by rapper Cam'ron.

Now a filmmaker and innovator he has produced the fantasy thriller, The Ascension, starring Corbin Bernsen and a romantic dark comedy entitled Heterosexuals, starring J. Robert Spencer from Broadway's Musical "Jersey Boys."

Ted Kotcheff, director and executive producer to NBC's Law & Order: Special Victims Unit, closed the deal to have Saillant direct his documentary, The Apprenticeship of Ted Kotcheff, which explores Kotcheff's life and times as a Canadian/Hollywood Director. Academy Award Winner Richard Dreyfuss will be narrating the documentary. Kotcheff, was the helmer of the first Rambo movie First Blood starring Sylvester Stallone and Weekend at Bernie's starring Andrew McCarthy.  Kotcheff has several films under his belt but he is best known for his longevity and success with NBC's Law & Order: Special Victims Unit, where Saillant has been privileged in shadowing Kotcheff for several seasons.

Prior to starting his production company, Angel Light Pictures Entertainment Group, Saillant served as an energy consultant to corporate giants such as Con Edison and pharmaceutical companies for many years.  Saillant continues his work by connecting with the industry's most influential and talented people, and later expanded his companies range of services to include consulting with leading American and international corporations in Green productions.

On April 18, 2012, addressing the students and staff of Syracuse University entitled “green economy,” followed by an overview of sustainable entertainment strategies as executed by Saillant.

Saillant on June 2, 2012, interviewed Oscar Winner Kevin Spacey is a maverick among actors in Hollywood. Kevin Spacey, along with Dana Brunetti, President of Trigger Street Productions and Benjamin Leavitt, writer and director and US winner of the Jameson First Shot for his short film "The Ventriloquist" starring Kevin Spacey, shared in what was an incredible premiere in New York City. Benjamin Leavit, was one of three winners out of 748 international entries whose script, "The Ventriloquist," was chosen to be produced by Trigger Street Productions for the short film competition.

References

1975 births
Living people
New York Institute of Technology alumni
American film directors
American male film actors
Male actors from New York (state)